Weatherall Bay is an Arctic waterway in Qikiqtaaluk Region, Nunavut, Canada. It is located in the Byam Martin Channel, northeast of Melville Island. Domett Point is at its mouth.

References

Bays of Qikiqtaaluk Region